The Merit Medal in Silver, post-nominal letters MMS, was instituted by the President of the Republic of South Africa in April 1996. It was awarded to veteran cadres of Umkhonto we Sizwe, the military wing of the African National Congress, who had distinguished themselves during the "struggle" by exceptionally meritorious service and particular devotion to duty.

Umkhonto we Sizwe
Umkhonto we Sizwe, abbreviated as MK, "Spear of the Nation" in isiZulu, was the para-military wing of the African National Congress (ANC). It was established on 16 December 1961, to wage an armed "struggle" against the Nationalist government inside South Africa. On 27 April 1994, Umkhonto we Sizwe was amalgamated with six other military forces into the South African National Defence Force (SANDF).

Institution
The Merit Medal in Silver, post-nominal letters MMS, was instituted by the President in April 1996. It is the middle award of a set of three decorations for merit, along with the Decoration for Merit in Gold and the Merit Medal in Bronze.

Umkhonto we Sizwe's military decorations and medals were modelled on those of the South African Defence Force and these three decorations are the approximate equivalents of, respectively, the Southern Cross Decoration and Pro Merito Decoration, the Southern Cross Medal (1975) and Pro Merito Medal (1975), and the Military Merit Medal.

Award criteria
The decoration could be awarded to veteran cadres of Umkhonto we Sizwe who had distinguished themselves during the "struggle" by exceptionally meritorious service and particular devotion to duty.

Order of wear

The position of the Merit Medal in Silver in the official military and national orders of precedence was revised upon the institution of a new set of honours on 27 April 2003, but it remained unchanged.

Umkhonto we Sizwe
  
Official MK order of precedence:
 Preceded by the Decoration for Merit in Gold (DMG).
 Succeeded by the Merit Medal in Bronze (MMB).

South African National Defence Force until 26 April 2003
  
Official SANDF order of precedence:
 Preceded by the Marumo Medal, Class I of the Republic of Bophuthatswana.
 Succeeded by the Silver Medal for Merit (SMM) of the Azanian People's Liberation Army.
Official national order of precedence:
 Preceded by the Medal of the Order of the Leopard of the Republic of Bophuthatswana.
 Succeeded by the Silver Medal for Merit (SMM) of the Azanian People's Liberation Army.

Description
Obverse
The Merit Medal in Silver was struck in silver, to fit in a circle 38 millimetres in diameter. It depicts the Umkhonto we Sizwe emblem in a dark blue enameled roundel, in the centre of a five-pointed starburst of radiating points.

Reverse
The reverse displays the embellished pre-1994 South African Coat of Arms.

Ribbon
The ribbon is 32 millimetres wide and dark blue, with a 12 millimetres wide white band in the centre.

Discontinuation
Conferment of the Merit Medal in Silver was discontinued upon the institution of a new set of honours on 27 April 2003.

References

Military decorations and medals of uMkhonto we Sizwe
Awards established in 1996
Awards disestablished in 2003
1996 establishments in South Africa